Abel Khaled (born 9 November 1992) is a French-Algerian footballer who plays as an right winger for CSO Amnéville in the Championnat National 3.

Career

SR Delémont
Khaled signed with SR Delémont on 28 November 2018.

Honours

Club
 USM Alger
 Algerian Super Cup (1): 2016

References

External links

 
 

1992 births
Living people
Association football forwards
Algerian footballers
Algerian expatriate footballers
French footballers
French expatriate footballers
French sportspeople of Algerian descent
Ligue 1 players
Ligue 2 players
Championnat National players
Championnat National 2 players
Championnat National 3 players
Luxembourg National Division players
Algerian Ligue Professionnelle 1 players
SAS Épinal players
Stade Brestois 29 players
USM Alger players
DRB Tadjenanet players
SR Delémont players
US Mondorf-les-Bains players
CSO Amnéville players
French expatriate sportspeople in Switzerland
Algerian expatriate sportspeople in Switzerland
French expatriate sportspeople in Luxembourg
Expatriate footballers in Switzerland
Expatriate footballers in Luxembourg